Gina Alexis Rodriguez (born July 30, 1984) is an American actress. She is known for her leading role as Jane Villanueva in The CW satirical romantic dramedy series Jane the Virgin (2014–2019), for which she received a Golden Globe Award in 2015.

Born and raised in Chicago, Rodriguez began her career in 2003 in theater productions and made her screen debut in an episode of the police procedural drama series Law & Order. Her breakthrough came in 2012, in the independent musical-drama film Filly Brown. She has gone on to star in such films as Deepwater Horizon (2016), Ferdinand (2017), Annihilation (2018), Miss Bala (2019), Someone Great (2019) and Scoob! (2020). She also voiced the titular character of the Netflix animated action-adventure series Carmen Sandiego.

Early years
Gina Alexis Rodriguez was born in Chicago, Illinois, the youngest daughter of Puerto Rican parents, Magali and Gino Rodriguez, a boxing referee. She has two sisters and an older brother. She was raised in the Belmont Cragin neighborhood on Chicago's Northwest Side.

At the age of seven, Rodriguez performed at the salsa dance company Fantasia Juvenil. Rodriguez was raised Catholic, and went to high school at St. Ignatius College Prep where she was two years behind the comedian John Mulaney.  She has stated that she did not attend "Jake McNamara's party" which is the subject of one of Mulaney's bits. She focused on salsa dancing until age 17 when she began acting more.

At the age of 16, she was among thirteen teenagers to be accepted into Columbia University's Theatrical Collaboration. She attended NYU's Tisch School of the Arts. She trained for four years at the Atlantic Theater Company and Experimental Theatre Wing, and earned with a Bachelor of Fine Arts degree in 2005.

She portrayed Frida Kahlo in the world premiere of Casa Blue in the United Kingdom, in the play called The Last Moments in the Life of Frida Kahlo at the American Stage Theatre.

Career

Rodriguez made her screen debut appearing in an episode of Law & Order in 2004. She later has appeared on Eleventh Hour, Army Wives and The Mentalist. On October 19, 2011, Rodriguez landed the recurring role, Beverly, in the soap opera series The Bold and the Beautiful. She received a role in the musical film Go for It!, for which she received a 2011 Imagen Awards nomination.

In 2012, Rodriguez played young hip-hop artist Majo Tenorio in the independent musical-drama film Filly Brown, for which she won an Imaged Award. She received good reviews for her performance in film. She also was the recipient of the Best Actor Award at the First Run Film Festival in New York. On June 9, 2013, Gina won the Inaugural Lupe Award. On April 16, 2013, during an interview, she revealed she was offered a role in the Lifetime television series Devious Maids, but turned it down. On October 16, 2013, she joined the cast of the movie Sleeping With The Fishes. She is also working on an album.

On February 27, 2014, Entertainment Weekly announced that Rodriguez would play the titular role of Jane Villanueva in Jane the Virgin, for which she went on to win a Golden Globe Award. On June 4, 2014, Rodriguez joined the cast of the upcoming drama film Sticky Notes. In August 2015, she co-hosted the 2015 Teen Choice Awards with Ludacris and Josh Peck. She voiced Mary in the animated film The Star, which was released in November 2017, as well as Una in Blue Sky Studios' Ferdinand a month later and played Anya in the science fiction thriller film Annihilation, opposite Natalie Portman. She also voices Carmen Sandiego in the Netflix animated series Carmen Sandiego which premiered on January 18, 2019. In March 2018, Netflix announced that they had acquired the live-action film rights for Carmen Sandiego and that Rodriguez would star as Sandiego in the film.

Rodriguez owns the production company I Can & I Will Productions. She worked on projects at CBS and The CW centered around the Latino community. She served as a producer and starred in the 2019 Netflix romantic comedy film Someone Great, where her character sang and danced in her underwear to Lizzo's Truth Hurts, ultimately making the song more popular and hit number one on the Billboard Hot 100.

In 2019, Rodriguez starred as the title character in the action thriller film Miss Bala. In the same year, it was announced that Rodriguez was cast in the upcoming Netflix science fiction thriller Awake. She also voiced the role of Velma Dinkley in the computer animated adventure film Scoob!.

Rodriguez served as the executive producer for the Disney+ show Diary of a Future President, where she also starred as the title character as an adult. She was nominated for the Children's and Family Emmy Award for Outstanding Guest Performance for the show's second season.

Personal life 
In an interview, Rodriguez revealed that she has suffered from Hashimoto's disease, a thyroid condition, since the age of 19.

In a 2014 interview, she said, "I grew up Catholic. I have Jewish in my family and I attend a Christian church in Hollywood. I am basically all over the place."

In 2016, Rodriguez began dating actor, model, and amateur Muay Thai fighter Joe LoCicero, whom she met on the set of Jane the Virgin. On August 7, 2018, Rodriguez confirmed in an interview with Us Weekly that she and LoCicero were engaged.  On May 4, 2019, the couple married and on July 30, 2022, Rodriguez revealed on Instagram that she was pregnant with her and LoCicero's first child.

Philanthropy
Rodriguez has been increasingly involved with various charities and philanthropic efforts, made possible by her rising visibility as a film and television actress. Most notably, she became involved with various organizations in 2015, ranging from CustomInk to Naja Lingerie, all of which Rodriguez has stated have a special connection to her life and experiences.

On March 16, 2015, she was announced as a new member of the HSF's (Hispanic Scholarship Fund) Board of Directors. The HSF is the United States' biggest non-profit organization which supports Hispanic American higher education. Because attaining an education was the biggest priority in Rodriguez's household, coupled with her determination to work towards a degree, she was able to work towards receiving a HSF scholarship. For her placement on the Board of Directors, Rodriguez will help to support HSF in a matchless and meaningful way, therefore making sure that HSF's mission will continue to support the original values and commitment to education. Rodriguez has stated that this is a great opportunity to say thank you [to the HSF] and to help open doors for Latino students to follow.

Later in 2015, PACER's (The Parent Advocacy Coalition for Educational Rights) National Bullying Prevention Center teamed up with CustomInk and enlisted the help of various celebrities, Rodriguez among them, to raise money for their fifth annual "Be Good to Each Other Campaign". Throughout the month of October 2015, people were encouraged to purchase a celebri-tee from CustomInk, who would donate all the proceeds from bullying prevention T-shirts to PACER. Rodriguez, in designing a celebri-tee which featured the phrase "Kindness Is Always In Style" in cursive print, took a stand for kindness, acceptance, and inclusion in support of bullying prevention, and stated that her parents always taught [her] the power of thinking positively and treating others with respect. She also hopes that through the Be Good to Each Other Campaign, such a message could be continued to be spread to younger generations.

Also in October 2015, Rodriguez was announced as a partner of Naja, a lingerie line founded in 2014 with ambitions to help women and the environment. Because Naja is vertically integrated, thereby shortening manufacturing lead times by up to eighty percent, it allows the company's savings to go towards school books, lunches, and uniforms for employees' children, and there's also an emphasis on a flexible work environment. Having seen the hardships of single mothers through a close friend from college, Rodriguez wanted to support a company that primarily employed single mothers and allowed them to work from home and provide for their families. She also cites Naja's commitment to creating lingerie for women of all shapes and sizes and encouraging body confidence as a factor for becoming involved with the lingerie line; admitting that it was a process for her to fall in love with her own body, Rodriguez also spoke on the importance of empowering women to love their own bodies and what they wear. Naja is also environmentally-conscious in its production, as more than half of all of its pieces are made of synthetics (like nylon)—that have been fabricated from recycled plastic bottles—and makes use of digital printing as a more environmentally-friendly measure.

In 2016, Rodriguez was named to Oprah's SuperSoul 100 list of visionaries and influential leaders. In 2017, Rodriguez, among several other artists, sang on the single "Almost Like Praying". Sparked by Lin-Manuel Miranda, creator of Broadway's Hamilton, all proceeds from the song benefited those affected by Hurricane Maria in Puerto Rico.

Filmography

Film

Television

Directing

Awards and nominations

See also
 Puerto Ricans in Chicago

References

External links

 
 

1984 births
Living people
21st-century American actresses
Actresses from Chicago
American actresses of Puerto Rican descent
American people of Jewish descent
American Christians
American film actresses
American stage actresses
American television actresses
American voice actresses
Best Musical or Comedy Actress Golden Globe (television) winners
Hispanic and Latino American actresses
Tisch School of the Arts alumni
American women television directors
American television directors
St. Ignatius College Prep alumni